The year 2005 is the 9th year in the history of the Pride Fighting Championships, a mixed martial arts promotion based in Japan. 2005 had 10 events beginning with, Pride 29 - Fists of Fire.

Title fights

Debut Pride FC fighters

The following fighters fought their first Pride FC fight in 2005:

 Alexandru Lungu
 Aliev Makhmud
 Andrei Semenov
 Daisuke Sugie
 Daniel Acacio
 David Abbott
 Denis Kang
 Dong Sik Yoon
 Fabrício Werdum
 Ibragim Magomedov
 In Seok Kim
 Jean Silva

 Joachim Hansen
 Josh Thomson
 Jutaro Nakao
 Ken Kaneko
 Luiz Azeredo
 Masanori Suda
 Michihiro Omigawa
 Milton Vieira
 Murad Chunkaiev
 Naoyuki Kotani
 Pawel Nastula

 Pedro Rizzo
 Phil Baroni
 Roman Zentsov
 Ryuichi Murata
 Tatsuya Kawajiri
 Tomomi Iwama
 Tsuyoshi Kosaka
 Wagner da Conceicao Martins
 Yoshiro Maeda
 Yves Edwards
 Aaron Riley

Events list

Pride 29: Fists of Fire

Pride 29: Fists of Fire was an event held on February 20, 2005 at Osaka-jo Hall in Osaka, Japan.

Results

Pride FC: Bushido 6

Pride FC: Bushido 6 was an event held on April 3, 2005 at Osaka-jo Hall in Osaka, Japan.

Results

Pride FC: Total Elimination 2005

Pride FC: Total Elimination 2005 was an event held on April 23, 2005 at Osaka-jo Hall in Osaka, Japan.

Results

Pride GP 2005 Middleweight Bracket

Pride FC: Bushido 7

Pride FC: Bushido 7 was an event held on May 22, 2005 at Osaka-jo Hall in Osaka, Japan.

Results

Pride FC: Critical Countdown 2005

Pride FC: Critical Countdown 2005 was an event held on June 26, 2005 at Osaka-jo Hall in Osaka, Japan.

Results

Pride GP 2005 Middleweight Bracket

Pride FC: Bushido 8

Pride FC: Bushido 8 was an event held on July 17, 2005 at Osaka-jo Hall in Osaka, Japan.

Results

Pride FC: Final Conflict 2005

Pride FC: Final Conflict 2005 was an event held on August 28, 2005 at Osaka-jo Hall in Osaka, Japan.

Results

Pride GP 2005 Middleweight Bracket

Pride FC: Bushido 9

Pride FC: Bushido 9 was an event held on September 25, 2005 at Ariake Coliseum in Tokyo, Japan.

Results

Welterweight Tournament Bracket

Lightweight Tournament Bracket

Pride 30: Fully Loaded

Pride 30: Fully Loaded was an event held on October 23, 2005 at Saitama Super Arena in Saitama, Japan.

Results

Pride FC: Shockwave 2005

Pride FC: Shockwave 2005 was an event held on December 31, 2005 at Saitama Super Arena in Saitama, Japan. The event included the finals of the Pride Welterweight and Lightwent tournaments that began at Pride: Bushido 9, a rematch between Wanderlei Silva and Ricardo Arona for the Pride Middleweight Championship, and a main event between Olympic judokas Naoya Ogawa and Hidehiko Yoshida.

Results

Welterweight Tournament Bracket

Lightweight Tournament Bracket

See also
 Pride Fighting Championships
 List of Pride Fighting Championships champions
 List of Pride Fighting events

References

Pride Fighting Championships events
2005 in mixed martial arts